Prostanthera howelliae is a flowering plant in the mint family Lamiaceae and is endemic to New South Wales and Queensland. It is a small shrub with narrow stems, aromatic, hairy leaves and pink, purple or violet, tube-shaped flowers.

Description
The leaves have a very short stalk, sometimes a maroon tinge and are covered with short, cone-shaped hairs.

As with many other prostantheras, the petal tube has two "lips" with the upper one having two lobes and the lower one three lobes. Flowering occurs in spring.

Taxonomy and naming
The species was first formally described in 1929 by William Blakely and the description was published in Proceedings of the Linnean Society of New South Wales. The specific epithet (howelliae) honours "Mrs. T.J. Howell, who, for a number of years, has taken a keen interest in the native flora".

Distribution and habitat
This prostanthera grows in woodland and shrubland, often in gravelly or sandy soil, in the eastern half of New South Wales and in Queensland.

References

howelliae
Plants described in 1929
Flora of New South Wales
Flora of Queensland
Taxa named by William Blakely